Major-General Sir Henry West Hodgson  (29 June 1868 – 5 February 1930) was an officer of the British Army.

He was born 29 June 1868 and died 5 February 1930 and buried at the St Mary Magdalene Church Bolney England. He was the Regimental Colonel of the 14th King's Hussars and the commanding officer of the 15th (The King's) Hussars. He also commanded the Australian Mounted Division during the Sinai and Palestine Campaign of the First World War.

Early life
Henry West Hodgson was born 29 June 1868 the second son of Barnard Beckett Hodgson and Mabel Gertrude, married in 1839. Their older son Barnard Thornton Hodgson was a barrister, Justice of the Peace and became a lieutenant-colonel 4th Battalion, Royal Sussex Regiment.

Military career
Hodgson joined the 15th (The King's) Hussars a cavalry regiment of the British Army in 1889. He was promoted captain in 1895 and became their adjutant on 17 December 1893. His was next promoted to major on 29 November 1899, and later became the commanding officer in 1907, during which he was appointed to Royal Victorian Order on 5 November 1910. Following his service as commanding officer Hodgson was put on the half-pay list on 10 October 1911.

First World War
Following the Allied withdrawal he went to Egypt and fought with the Western Frontier Force in the Senussi Campaign. In February 1917, he was given his first divisional command, the Imperial Mounted Division, later renamed the Australian Mounted Division. His immediate commander General Harry Chauvel said of him "his masterpiece was probably his skilful withdrawal of his own division and attached brigades from Es Salt during the second Trans-Jordan raid, when, owing to the defection of certain of our Arab allies and a determined counter-attack by the enemy, he was surrounded on three sides, and his line of retreat almost cut off in extremely difficult country. His coolness and determination on that occasion, coupled with the bravery of his troops, saved Australia very serious losses, and earned him the complete confidence of his troops".

Later career
Hodgson was promoted to substantive major-general on 1 January 1919, having only been a substantive colonel and a temporary major-general beforehand. For his service in the Middle East he was awarded the Order of the Nile (Second Class) in November 1919, by the Sultan of Egypt, and the Military Order of Savoy by Italy.

He later became the Regimental Colonel of the 14th King's Hussars overseeing the amalgamation with the 20th Hussars when they became the 14th/20th King's Hussars. His last command was the 44th (Home Counties) Division before retiring from the army in 1927. Henry West Hodgson died in London 5 February 1930 and was buried at the St Mary Magdalene Church Bolney England.

Footnotes

References

1868 births
1930 deaths
British Army major generals
Military personnel from London
British Army cavalry generals of World War I
Companions of the Order of the Bath
Knights Commander of the Order of St Michael and St George
Commanders of the Royal Victorian Order
15th The King's Hussars officers
14th King's Hussars officers
14th/20th King's Hussars officers